The United Nations International Computing Centre (UNICC) was established in 1971 by a Memorandum of Agreement among the United Nations (UN), the United Nations Development Programme (UNDP) and the World Health Organization (WHO), pursuant to resolution 2741 (XXV) of the United Nations General Assembly. It was created as an inter-organization facility to provide electronic data processing services for themselves and other Users.

UNICC has 50 years of experience providing Information and Communications Technology (ICT) services to United Nations programmes, funds and entities.  Its mission is to provide ICT services to the United Nations family, maximise the sharing of infrastructure, systems and skills and generate economies of scale to benefit its over 80 Clients and Partner Organizations, including United Nations and related not-for-profit entities.

UNICC now has over 800 staff with UNICC Headquarters in Geneva, Switzerland and offices in New York City - U.S., Brindisi and Rome - Italy, Valencia, Spain and Hanoi, Vietnam.

UNICC Mission

UNICC is the core shared service provider for the United Nations system, providing agile, cost-effective, and UN-audit compliant high value digital business solutions. UNICC is looking for competent, experienced and highly motivated individuals, with a desire to work as International Civil Servants, and who are prepared to evolve in a challenging and rewarding environment.

UNICC offices
 Geneva, Switzerland
 Valencia - Spain
 Rome, Italy 
 Brindisi, Italy 
 New York City, U.S.

UNICC services
Client Services 
UNICC offers Client Services in the areas of consulting (strategic advisory services and subject matter expertise).
 UNICC Consulting
 IT Advisory Firms
 Learning
 Digital Business Communications
 Project Management
 Application Development
 Monitoring
 Robotic Process Automation
 Electronic Signature services
 Secure AUTHN services

Software Services and Cloud 
UNICC offers its Clients hosting and delivery of software applications.
 Amazon Web Services Management
 Microsoft 365 Management
 Microsoft Azure Management
 Cloud Web Hosting
 Microsoft Dynamics 365
 ServiceNow Support

Information Security 
UNICC's information security services cover cyber security oversight and governance as well as a whole spectrum of operational components.
 Governance and CISO Support
 Threat Intelligence Network
 Security Operations Centre
 Security Information and Event Management
 Phishing and Vulnerability Management
 Penetration testing
 Incident Response and Forensics
 Information Security Awareness
 Infrastructure and Network Support
 PKI Digital Identity

Platform Services 
UNICC offers computing platforms that allow administrators and developers to create, run and customise their application suites, including software-as-a-service components.
 Enterprise Resource Planning
 Enterprise Web Applications, Hosting and Traffic Analysis
 Enterprise SharePoint
 Business Intelligence Platform Support

Analytics and Data Management 
UNICC offers Data and Analytics services across the entire business digital spectrum.
 Consulting and Support
 Data Analytics – Visualisation
 Advanced Analytics
 Data Management
 Database Services

Infrastructure Services 
UNICC provides computing infrastructure resources that to easily manage networking, data centres and infrastructure elements for their business needs and application stack.
 Business Continuity and Disaster Recovery Planning
 Servers and Enterprise Server Support
 Storage on Demand and Management 
 Enterprise Backup
 Data Centre Consolidation
 Network Services
 Internet and Connectivity
 OneICTBox

UNICC awards 
  Information security - 2020 CSO50 Award for its Common Secure Information Security services
  Innovation - ITU Innovation Challenge 2020 winner for UNICC and Microsoft's UN Digital Academy 
  UN Digital Identity - UN Digital ID project from the UN Digital Solutions Centre, with operations by UNICC,  is the winner of the Reimagine the UN Together Challenge 2020 
  Information security - 2017 CSO50 Award for its Common Secure Information Security services

References

External links
 UNICC Official Website 
 
 
 

United Nations International Computing Centre
United Nations organizations based in Geneva